The International Society of Biomechanics, commonly known as the ISB, is a society dedicated to promoting biomechanics in its various forms.  It promotes the study of all areas of biomechanics at the international level, although special emphasis is given to the biomechanics of human movement.  The Society encourages international contacts amongst scientists, promotes the dissemination of knowledge, and forms liaisons with national organizations.  The Society's membership includes scientists from a variety of disciplines including anatomy, physiology, engineering (mechanical, industrial aerospace, etc.), orthopedics, rehabilitation medicine, sport science and medicine, ergonomics, electro-physiological kinesiology and others.

History 

The decision to establish the society was made at the 3rd International Seminar on Biomechanics held in Rome in 1971.  This meeting was organized by the “Working Group on Biomechanics” which was part of the International Council of Sport and Physical Education, which itself was part of the United Nations Educational, Scientific, and Cultural Organization (UNESCO).  At this meeting on September 29 it was voted to form the ISB at the next meeting.  The 4th International Seminar on Biomechanics was held at Penn State University from August 26 until August 31, 1973. The constitution was voted on and approved on August 29.  Two hundred and fifty of those present became charter members of the society.

Executive Council 

The ISB is governed by its Executive Council.  This council is elected every two years, by ballot, and is composed of officers and council members that represent countries from throughout the world and scientific areas that span all facets of biomechanics.  The council, which meets annually, provides leadership for the continued development of the Society.  Many on-going activities are performed by Council appointed sub-committees.  The council also publishes a quarterly newsletter, known as ISB NOW, to inform members of Society developments and future events.

Congresses 

The ISB was formed in 1973 and has held a conference every other year since then.  The counting of the congress started with the 1st International Seminar on Biomechanics held in Zurich in 1967.  The list of conferences and their geographical locations are given below.

Wartenweiler Memorial Lecture 

At each ISB Congress the Wartenweiler Memorial Lecture is presented.  This lecture is named to honor Jurg Wartenweiler (1915-1976) who was the first president of the ISB.  He organized The First International Seminar on Biomechanics in Zürich, Switzerland in 1967.  This conference eventually morphed into the biennial ISB Congresses.  He was a faculty member at the ETH Zürich.  Typically this lecture has been the first academic presentation of the conference.  The list of Wartenweiler Memorial Lecturers and their topics follow.

Muybridge Medal 

At the ISB Congress every two years, the ISB presents the Muybridge Award.  This award is the most prestigious award of the Society and is awarded for career achievements in biomechanics. The award is named after Eadward Muybridge (1830-1904), who was one of the first to use cinematography for the study of human and animal movement.  The list of Muybridge Award winners and their lecture topics follow,

Honorary Member 

The ISB has a number of categories of membership including: student, charter, full, and emeritus.  The remaining category is that of honorary member, which is restricted to a few individuals whose work has made outstanding contributions to the development of Biomechanics. The honorary membership currently consists of 16 individuals.  Unfortunately some of these members have died (Levan Chkhaidze, James Hay, Ernst Jokl, Chauncey Morehouse, John Paul, Jacquelin Perry, David Winter).  The other honorary members and their current academic affiliations are,
 Peter R. Cavanagh, University of Washington, USA
 Paavo Komi, University of Jyvaskyla, Finland
 Hideji Matsui, University of Nagoya, Japan
 Doris Miller, University of Western Ontario, Canada
 Mitsumasa Miyashita, University of Tokyo, Japan
 Richard C. Nelson, Penn State University, USA
 Benno Nigg, University of Calgary, Canada
 Robert Norman, University of Waterloo, Canada
 Fred Yeadon, Loughborough University, UK

Affiliated Groups 

Many other biomechanics groups and societies are affiliate members of the ISB.  These groups include:
 American Society of Biomechanics
 Australia/New Zealand Society of Biomechanics
 Brazilian Society of Biomechanics
 British Association of Sport and Exercise Sciences
 Bulgarian Society of Biomechanics
 Canadian Society of Biomechanics
 Chinese Society of Sports Biomechanics
 Czech Society of Biomechanics
 Danish Society of Biomechanics
 German Society of Biomechanics
 Hellenic Society of Biomechanics (Greece)
 International Society of Biomechanics in Sports
 Japanese Society of Biomechanics
 Korean Society for Orthopaedic Research, Biomechanics, and Basic Science
 Polish Society of Biomechanics
 Portuguese Society of Biomechanics
 Russian Society of Biomechanics
 Societe de Biomecanique (France)
 Taiwanese Society of Biomechanics

Technical  and Working Groups 

The Society also supports technical and working groups, which are groups of individuals dedicated to enhancing knowledge of specialized areas within biomechanics.   Currently active technical sections include,
 Computer Simulation
 Shoulder Biomechanics
 Footwear Biomechanics
 3-D Motion Analysis

References 

Biomechanics
International learned societies